Faristenia furtumella is a moth in the family Gelechiidae. It is found in the Russian Far East, Korea and Japan (Honshu).

The larvae feed on Quercus mongolica.

References

Faristenia
Moths described in 1991